Bawburgh is a village and civil parish in the South Norfolk district of Norfolk, England, lying in the valley of the River Yare about  west of Norwich city centre.  According to the 2001 census it had a population of 466, increasing to 595 at the 2011 census. Bawburgh is very close to the relatively new Norfolk and Norwich University Hospital and the Bowthorpe Estate.

The name is first recorded as Bauenburc in 1086 and is from Old English 'stronghold of a man called Beawa.'

The mill at the centre of the village was the original site of the manufacture of Colman's mustard.

There is a pub called The King's Head.

Bawburgh is a significant location in the legend of St Walstan, the 10th-11th century patron saint of farm labourers. According to legend, Walstan was born at Bawburgh (or possibly Blythburgh in Suffolk) into a Saxon noble family circa 970, but at the age of 12 gave up his privileged life, choosing instead to work as a farm labourer in Taverham. His initial journey on foot from Bawburgh to Taverham took Walstan through Costessey, where  he donated his noble garments to two passing peasants. After many years, Walstan's imminent death was foretold by an angel and he asked a priest for the last rites; no water was available but a miraculous spring welled up on the spot. On his death, Walstan's body was returned to Bawburgh on a cart drawn by two white oxen. The oxen stopped at Costessey, where a second spring gushed forth and at Bawburgh, where a third spring appeared. St Walstan's Well at Bawburgh is the only one of the legendary springs that remains identifiable. Walstan's body was taken into the church and Bawburgh became the centre of a cult of pilgrimage, with several miracles recorded.

Church of St Mary & St Walstan
The church of Bawburgh St Mary and St Walstan is one of 124 existing round-tower churches in Norfolk. St Walstan's Day is celebrated on an annual basis with a church service and walk to the nearby St Walstan's Well.  The church is a Grade I listed building.. There is a canonical sundial on the south wall.

War Memorial
Bawburgh's War Memorial is located in St. Mary and St. Walstan's Churchyard and holds the following names for the First World War:
 Corporal William J. Child (1895-1917), 6th Battalion, Durham Light Infantry
 Lance-Corporal Alphonso E. Allison (1893-1916), 7th Battalion, Royal Norfolk Regiment
 Rifleman Cyril S. Harmer (1892-1918), 2nd Battalion, Royal Irish Rifles
 Private Herbert H. Woods (1882-1917), 4th Battalion, Middlesex Regiment
 Private Dan W. Allison (1888-1914), 1st Battalion, Scots Guards
 Horace A. Allison
 Herbert H. Gould

And, the following for the Second World War:
 Leading-Airman Percy W. Clitheroe DSM (1916-1941), HMS Victorious (R38)
 Corporal Herbert H. Mortimer (1913-1944), 1st Battalion, Royal Norfolk Regiment

References

External links

St Mary's and St Walstan's on the European Round Tower Churches Website
Bawburgh Water Mill
Village Website

South Norfolk
Villages in Norfolk
Civil parishes in Norfolk